Chudleigh is an ancient wool town located within the Teignbridge District Council area of Devon, England between Newton Abbot and Exeter. The electoral ward with the same name had a population of 6,125 at the 2011 census.

Geography

Chudleigh is very close to the edge of Dartmoor and in the Teign Valley. Nearby Castle Dyke is an Iron Age Hill Fort which demonstrates far earlier settlement in the area. It is also near Haldon Forest, a Forestry Commission property. The town has been bypassed by the A38 road since 1972.

Great Fire of Chudleigh
The weather conditions in Devon in the year 1807 have been described as a drought. Weeks without rain left many people short of water and had farmers worrying about their crops. At around noon on 22 May, a small fire broke out in a pile of furze stacked near the ovens at a bakery in Culver Street (now New Exeter Street). According to later reports, the staff in the bakery seemed unaware of the danger this posed, but the fire, fed by the exceptionally dry fuel, exploded. In the shortest time imaginable, the fire had spread to the roof of the bakery (thatched, as were 90% of the houses in Chudleigh at the time) and huge hunks of burning reed and straw were swept aloft by a rapidly growing north-easterly wind.  After the fire, only 180 houses out of 300 house were left standing.

Parish church
The church of St Martin and St Mary was consecrated in 1259. The structure is medieval but was heavily restored in 1868. The rood screen has paintings of saints and prophets and the Courtenay family coat of arms.

In 1887 St Bridget's Abbey of Syon built a monastery, known as Chudleigh Abbey, which they occupied until 1925.

Town hall

Chudleigh Town Hall, which was designed in the Italianate style dates from 1865.

Historic estates
Various historic estates are situated in the parish of Chudleigh, including:

Whiteway
Whiteway House is a Grade II* listed Georgian house set in parkland 2½ miles north of Chudleigh, at the foot of the Haldon Hills, built in the 1770s by John Parker, 1st Baron Boringdon (1735–1788) of Saltram House, Plympton, Devon.

Hams
Hams Barton is a grade II* listed building, formerly the seat of the Hunt family, situated one-mile north-east of the town, near Kate Brook. The Hunt family was settled there before the reign of Queen Elizabeth I (1558-1603). Thomas Hunt (d.1548) was thrice Mayor of Exeter, including in 1517 and 1537. A fine banqueting room survives, called by Pevsner "the sumptuous first-floor great chamber, one of the best of its date in the county". Several monuments to the Hunt family survive in the Hunt Aisle in Chudleigh church.

Chudleigh Carnival
The carnival takes place annually in the second week in July and lasts a week.

See also
 Stokelake (a former school)

References

External links

Chudleigh Information web site, provided by The Chudleigh Business Guild
The Chudleigh History Group website

 
Towns in Devon
Teignbridge